Maelstrom is a fictional character appearing in American comic books published by Marvel Comics.

Publication history

Maelstrom first appears in Marvel Two-in-One #71 (Jan. 1981) and was created by Mark Gruenwald, Ralph Macchio, and Ron Wilson.

Fictional character biography
Maelstrom is the son of Phaeder, an Inhuman scientist banished from their city of Attilan for attempting cloning to increase Inhuman population numbers. Phaeder then lives among the Deviants, and bred with a Deviant female named Morga who gave birth to Maelstrom. With his father's tutoring, Maelstrom became a brilliant geneticist. After his father is incapacitated in an experiment, Maelstrom swears revenge on the Inhuman race and becomes a would-be conqueror.

Maelstrom has first contact with Earth's metahumans when he sends his superpowered minions—Phobius, Gronk, and Helio—to the scientific island facility Hydro-Base to steal an Anti-Terrigen mist compound. This substance can undo the effects of the Terrigen Mist and deprive the Inhumans of their abilities. Maelstrom's Minions, however, are defeated by heroes the Thing and Stingray. They are assisted by two Inhumans, Gorgon and Karnak. This leads to an encounter with another of Maelstrom's minions—Deathurge—who kills the defeated trio. Mister Fantastic and the Inhuman Triton deduce that their opponent may have originated from the old site of Attilan, which was an undersea location.

The Thing, Gorgon and Karnak travel via submarine to the old location, and discover a base where they are subsequently captured. The heroes later escape and together with the Inhuman king Black Bolt battle Maelstrom. The heroes hold off Maelstrom while Black Bolt intercepts and defuses a missile carrying the anti-Terrigen mist compound that is programmed to destroy Attilan. The Thing weakens Maelstrom by using the compound on the villain, and the heroes escape as the base self-detonates. Maelstrom's last act is to order Deathurge to kill him.

Maelstrom and his minions, however, are later revealed to be alive, as courtesy of advanced science their minds were transferred into new, cloned bodies. Maelstrom then attempts to siphon the energies of the Eternals, but is thwarted by the superhero team the Avengers, and after commanding Deathurge to kill him yet again, transfers his consciousness to a new clone body. Maelstrom then attempts to stop the Earth's rotation and absorb the kinetic energy, but is drawn into conflict with the Avengers once more. The android Vision discovers a way to overload Maelstrom's power source and his body becomes discorporate and floats free from Earth.

Maelstrom later encounters the Titanian Eternal Kronos, and learns of the existence of the entity Oblivion. Becoming Oblivion's avatar, Maelstrom then becomes determined to achieve Oblivion's goal of non-existence on a universal scale. Maelstrom assumes the powers of the entity Anomaly, becoming the embodiment of the abstract principle of anomaly. This brings Maelstrom into conflict with the agent of the entity Eon, the cosmic hero Quasar, in the Outer Void (realm of Oblivion). After several battles, Quasar finally defeats Maelstrom when caught off-guard and the power of Quasar's quantum bands consumes him. Maelstrom is later revived by his minions, but learns he had a son, Ransak, that would have been wiped from existence had he succeeded. Ashamed, he shrinks himself out of sight. 

Eventually, Maelstrom returns, attempting to destroy the universe by creating a device known as the Cosmic Crunch. He battles the Great Lakes Avengers, who are powerless to stop him. In order to be prepared, he hires Batroc the Leaper and his brigade to help him. During the final battle, Maelstrom is tricked into killing himself by Mr. Immortal after he tells him that the grand secret of the universe was eternal loneliness. His soul is later collected by Doorman, who was recently chosen by Oblivion as its new angel of death, replacing Deathurge, who was captured by Mr. Immortal.

Maelstrom was later encountered by Drax the Destroyer and Quasar when they were killed and sent to the realm of Oblivion. He came into possession of Phyla's Quantum Bands and used them to feed her to the Dragon of the Moon. He was eventually defeated by Drax and Wendell Vaughn and Phyla was able to escape from the Dragon—killing it in the process. However, it turns out that this was simply a ruse for Oblivion to gain a new Avatar of Death—Phyla-Vell.

Powers and abilities
Maelstrom can absorb, channel, and otherwise project all forms of kinetic energy for his own purposes, such as strength enhancement, concussive blasts, force field generation, and size shifting. For a short period, Maelstrom possessed Quasar's quantum bands, which enables him to draw on virtually unlimited power from the other-dimensional Quantum Zone. He was able to achieve "cosmic awareness" after learning this secret from the entity Eon.

He is a genius in the scientific disciplines of biology and genetics.

References

External links
 Maelstrom at Marvel.com

Characters created by Mark Gruenwald
Characters created by Ralph Macchio
Comics characters introduced in 1981
Fictional biologists
Fictional characters who can change size
Fictional characters with energy-manipulation abilities
Fictional characters with slowed ageing
Fictional characters with superhuman durability or invulnerability
Fictional geneticists
Inhumans
Marvel Comics characters with superhuman strength
Marvel Comics Deviants
Marvel Comics scientists
Marvel Comics supervillains